The Limberlost Forest and Wildlife Reserve is a publicly accessible private property near Huntsville, Ontario, Canada.  The private forest contains many lakes and forest stands with hiking, biking, skiing and snowshoeing trails throughout that has been made available to the public at no charge.  Limberlost practices a form of land management referred to as Conscientious Forest Management which focuses on ensuring the sustainability of their management objectives and actions for generations to come.  Some of the management actions undertaken by the private forest include sustainably harvesting timber using the Ontario Ministry of Natural Resources Single Tree Selection System; encouraging the use of the forest by all visitors and eco-tourists at no charge; supporting environmental research programs and institutes; and offering both modern and traditional forest land use options to the local community.  

Limberlost's primary objective is to offer continued free access to the 10,000 ac Muskoka property for the purpose of encouraging safe wilderness experiences.  They are able to accomplish this by supporting several youth organizations, such as the Trails Youth Initiative, as well as providing hiking trails, associated maps and safety information to day visitors.  Free use of the property is made possible by the accommodations business which is run in conjunction with Limberlost including rental of chalets, cottages, fish-camps, glamping sites and camp sites.  

The trails at the Limberlost Forest provide access to innumerable special natural features as well as tours around a number of the larger lakes.  Guests are encouraged to familiarize themselves with trail guide and safety information before embarking on their day tour.  

Access of the Limberlost Forest is available at the main gate located 3 km off of Muskoka Road 8 in Lake of Bays.  Limberlost does not permit the recreational use of snowmobiles, ATVs, UTVs, or any gas powered motor boats, however, bicycles, paddles, hiking boots, and snowshoes are welcome and encouraged.  

Since 2003, the Limberlost Reserve has been open to the public, receiving several thousand visitors per year mainly for hiking and bird-watching.

See also
Sustainable forest management

External links
 Limberlost Forest and Wildlife Reserve

Parks in the District Municipality of Muskoka
Nature reserves in Ontario
Forest reserves
Ecotourism